Dracunculidae is a family of parasitic nematodes belonging to the order Camallanida. All Dracunculidae are obligate tissue parasites of reptiles, birds, or mammals. 

Genera:
 Avioserpens Wehr & Chitwood, 1934 
 Dracunculus Reichard, 1759 
 Lockenloia Adamson & Caira, 1991

References

Nematodes